Jenova may refer to: 

Jenova (Final Fantasy), a character in the video game Final Fantasy VII 
Jenova Chen (born Xinghan Chen), video game developer and the founder of thatgamecompany
Jenova (film), a 1953 film

See also
Genoa
Genova (disambiguation)